Avatar: The Last Airbender is an upcoming American adventure fantasy television series. It is a live-action adaptation of the animated television series of the same name (2005–2008). It was first announced in September 2018. Albert Kim is set to be the showrunner, with an ensemble cast including Gordon Cormier, Dallas Liu, Kiawentiio, Ian Ousley, Paul Sun-Hyung Lee and Daniel Dae Kim.

The series is set to premiere on Netflix and will consist of eight 1-hour-long episodes.

Premise
The series is set in an Asiatic, war-torn world where certain people can "bend" one of the four classical elementswater, earth, fire, or air. Aang, the "Avatar" and the last living Airbender, is the "bridge" between the mortal and spirit world, and the only one capable of bending all four of the elements. The Avatar maintains the balance of the world and nature to bring peace, and Aang is now faced with the responsibility of ending the ambitions of the militaristic Fire Nation to conquer the world. With his new companions Katara and Sokka, Aang sets out to master the elements while pursued by the exiled Fire Nation prince Zuko, who seeks to regain his honor by capturing him.

Cast and characters

Main
 Gordon Cormier as Avatar Aang: A free-spirited and peaceful twelve-year-old airbender who was frozen in ice for a hundred years. When he wakes up, all the other airbenders have been wiped out by the Fire Nation and he is beholden on a quest to end the war and become the figurehead of balance and harmony for the world as the Avatar.
 Kiawentiio as Katara: A fourteen-year-old who is the last waterbender of her tribe after her mother was killed by the Fire Nation. Despite her personal tragedy, she joins Aang on his journey while growing to her true potential.
 Ian Ousley as Sokka: Katara's sixteen-year-old brother who has taken up becoming the quasi-leader of their tribe after their father left to fight in the war. He joins Aang on his mission along with Katara, and makes up for his lack of bending abilities with his intelligence, resourcefulness and trusty boomerang.
 Dallas Liu as Prince Zuko: The scarred, exiled and short-tempered seventeen-year-old crown prince of the Fire Nation, bent on capturing the Avatar to end his banishment and regain his honor.
 Paul Sun-Hyung Lee as General Iroh: A retired Fire Nation general and the wise and nurturing uncle and mentor to Zuko.

Recurring
 Daniel Dae Kim as Fire Lord Ozai: The tyrannical and sadistic ruler of the Fire Nation, and Prince Zuko and Princess Azula's father. Daniel Dae Kim, while not portraying the same character, has lent his voice to the Avatar franchise multiple times—the first time in Book 2 of The Last Airbender, where he voiced General Fong, and in The Legend of Korra, where he voiced Hiroshi Sato.
 Ken Leung as Commander Zhao: An ambitious, yet arrogant, ruthless and dishonorable Fire Nation naval officer and Zuko's bitter main rival in his pursuit of the Avatar.
 Maria Zhang as Suki: The leader of Kyoshi Island's elite all-female soldiers, the Kyoshi Warriors.
 Elizabeth Yu as Princess Azula: The cunning and prodigiously-gifted Princess of the Fire Nation and Prince Zuko's younger sister.
 Lim Kay Siu as Gyatso: A mischievous, chipper, kind and caring Air Nomad monk who is Aang's mentor and father figure.
 A Martinez as Pakku: A waterbending master from the Northern Water Tribe who serves as Aang's teacher.
 Amber Midthunder as Princess Yue: The princess of the Northern Water Tribe and love interest of Sokka.
 Yvonne Chapman as Avatar Kyoshi: The legendary earthbender Avatar preceding Aang's previous incarnation, Avatar Roku.
 Tamlyn Tomita as Yukari: Suki's mother and the fiercely protective mayor of her small village on Kyoshi Island.
 Casey Camp-Horinek as Gran Gran: The matriarch of the Southern Water Tribe, and Katara and Sokka's grandmother.
 C. S. Lee as Avatar Roku: The firebender Avatar who precedes Aang and serves as his mentor.
 Danny Pudi as The Mechanist: A single father and inventor from the Earth Kingdom.
 Utkarsh Ambudkar as King Bumi: The elderly king of Omashu who is Aang's oldest friend.
 James Sie as the Cabbage Merchant: An unfortunate merchant who normally has his produce continually destroyed. Sie reprises his role from the animated series.
 Rainbow Dickerson as Kya: The mother of Sokka and Katara.
 Joel Montgrand as Hakoda: The father of Sokka and Katara and chieftain of the Southern Water Tribe who left to fight in the war.
 Arden Cho as June: A bounty hunter.
 Momona Tamada as Ty Lee: Princess Azula's acrobatic friend who is skilled in chi-blocking.
 Thalia Tran as Mai: Princess Azula's other friend who is skilled in knife throwing and Zuko's love interest.
 Joel Oulette as Hahn: An arrogant Northern Water Tribe soldier betrothed to Princess Yue.
 Nathaniel Arcand as Arnook: The chief of the Northern Water Tribe.
 Meegwun Fairbrother as Avatar Kuruk: The Northern Water Tribe Avatar preceding Kyoshi.
 Irene Bedard as Yagoda: A Northern Water Tribe healer.
 Ryan Mah as Lieutenant Dang: An officer in the Fire Nation Navy.
 François Chau as the Great Sage: The leader of the Fire Sages at the Fire Temple.
 Sebastian Amoruso as Jet: The leader of the Freedom Fighters.
 Hiro Kanagawa as Fire Lord Sozin: The Fire Lord who started the 100-year war.
 George Takei as Koh the Face Stealer: A centipede-like spirit who uses the stolen faces of his victims.
 Randall Duk Kim as Wan Shi Tong: An Owl spirit who is in charge of the Spirit Library and is very distrustful towards humans.
 Lucian-River Chauhan as Teo: The Mechanist's son.
 Ruy Iskandar as Lieutenant Jee: A Fire Nation lieutenant on Zuko's ship.
 Jayden Zhang as an airbender who will appear in flashbacks.
 Pat Alec as a water tribe warrior injured in battle.
 Paul Cheng as an earthbender held prisoner.
 Taylor Lam Wright as the Duke: A member of the Freedom Fighters and Jet's friend.
Ciara Mandel, David Sakurai, Rohain Arora, and Jon Ray Dy Buco have been cast in undisclosed roles.

Production

Development
In September 2018, Netflix announced that a "reimagined" live-action remake of Avatar was to start production in 2019. The series' original creators, Michael Dante DiMartino and Bryan Konietzko, were initially announced to be the executive producers and showrunners. In June 2020, the creators departed the series due to creative differences. This was revealed after DiMartino published an open letter on his own website on August 12, 2020. The pair cited differences in their approach to the show compared with Netflix's vision, also citing a "negative and unsupporting" environment during their time with the studio. In August 2021, Albert Kim had officially joined as a writer, executive producer and showrunner; he commented in a blog post: "My first thought was, 'Why? What is there I could do or say with the story that wasn't done or said in the original?' But the more I thought about it, the more intrigued I became. We'll be able to see bending in a real and visceral way we've never seen before." In the same post, Kim emphasized that "throughout this process, our byword has been 'authenticity'. To the story. To the characters. To the cultural influences. Authenticity is what keeps us going, both in front of the camera and behind it." Dan Lin, Lindsey Liberatore, Michael Goi, and Roseanne Liang were also announced as executive producers with Goi and Liang both directing episodes of the series.

It was reported that each episode cost more than $15 million to make, with eight episodes per season.

Casting
Prior to their departure, DiMartino and Konietzko had revealed that they are committed to "culturally appropriate, non-whitewashed casting" according to a statement from Konietzko. Konietzko had said that he was hoping to include Dante Basco, the original voice actor who played Zuko. In August 2021 following leaked casting reports, Netflix revealed the show's cast for the main four characters: Gordon Cormier, Kiawentiio, Ian Ousley and Dallas Liu as Aang, Katara, Sokka and Zuko respectively. Kim felt that "this was a chance to showcase Asian and Indigenous characters as living, breathing people. Not just in a cartoon, but in a world that truly exists, very similar to the one we live in." In November 2021, Daniel Dae Kim, who previously voiced General Fong in the animated series and later Hiroshi Sato in The Legend of Korra, joined the cast of the series as Fire Lord Ozai. Later that month, Paul Sun-Hyung Lee, Lim Kay Siu, and Ken Leung joined the cast of the series, playing Iroh, Gyatso, and Commander Zhao respectively. In December, Elizabeth Yu, Yvonne Chapman, Tamlyn Tomita, Casey Camp-Horinek and Maria Zhang were added to the cast, respectively playing Azula, Avatar Kyoshi, Yukari (a new character added as Suki's mother in replacement of the mayor of Kyoshi Island), Gran Gran and Suki.

In April 2022, Arden Cho and Momona Tamada joined the cast as June and Ty-Lee. Later that month, C. S. Lee was cast as Avatar Roku. In June 2022, A Martinez and Amber Midthunder were cast as Master Pakku and Princess Yue respectively. In July 2022, it was revealed that James Sie would reprise his role as the Cabbage Merchant from the animated series. In September 2022, more additional roles were announced, with two of them being George Takei as the voice of Koh the Face Stealer and Randall Duk Kim as the voice of Wan Shi Tong. Takei previously voiced the Fire Nation Prison Rig Warden in the animated series, while Duk Kim had a minor role in the 2010 live-action film The Last Airbender.

Filming
Production and filming began in Vancouver, British Columbia on November 16, 2021. The series was filmed under the working titles Trade Winds and Blue Dawn. Principal photography wrapped on June 17, 2022. Stewart Whelan served as a cinematographer.

Visual effects
DNEG will handle visual effects.

Music
Jeremy Zuckerman, who composed music for the original show, was originally set to return to compose the music for the remake but later denied his involvement with the show after DiMartino and Konietzko left the project. On February 16, 2023 it was confirmed that Award-winning Japanese-American Composer Takeshi Furukawa was attached to the project as its composer.

References

External links
 
 

2020s American drama television series
Asian-American television
Avatar: The Last Airbender
English-language television shows
High fantasy television series
Martial arts television series
Television remakes
Television series about dysfunctional families
Television series about orphans
Television series about teenagers
Television shows about reincarnation
Television shows filmed in Vancouver
Upcoming drama television series
Upcoming Netflix original programming
Upcoming television series
Works based on animated television series